The 1984 Grand Prix International 1000 km was the second round of the 1984 World Endurance Championship. It took place at the Silverstone Circuit, Great Britain on 13 May 1984.

Official results
Class winners in bold. Cars failing to complete 75% of the winner's distance marked as Not Classified (NC).

† - The #74 Scorpion Racing Services Arundel-Ford was disqualified during the race for receiving technical assistance while still on the track.

Statistics 
 Pole Position - #4 Martini Racing - 1:13.84
 Fastest Lap - #1 Rothmans Porsche - 1:16.76
 Average Speed -

References 

 
 

Silverstone
Silverstone
6 Hours of Silverstone
May 1984 sports events in the United Kingdom